Shenzhen F.C. II, known as Xiangxue Eisiti for sponsorship reason, was a Chinese football team which played in Hong Kong First Division League in 2008–09 season. It was the reserve team of Shenzhen F.C., known as Shenzhen Xiangxue Eisiti (Shenzhen Xiangxue Shangqingyin) for sponsorship reasons at that time.

Home ground
Xiangxue Eisiti wanted to host its games at the sports ground of Shenzhen Bogang F.C. in Shajing, Bao'an District, but after inspection by the HKFA, the ground was considered unsuitable to host any league games. Instead, Xiangxue Eisiti had to play all their home games at Mong Kok Stadium or Siu Sai Wan Sports Ground.

See also
 Shenzhen F.C.
 Xiangxue Pharmaceutical (football)

References

Defunct football clubs in Hong Kong
Expatriated football clubs
Association football clubs established in 2008
Association football clubs disestablished in 2009